France competed at the 1968 Summer Olympics in Mexico City, Mexico. 200 competitors, 169 men and 31 women, took part in 107 events in 16 sports.

Medalists

Gold
 Colette Besson — Athletics, Women's 400 metres
 Daniel Morelon — Cycling, Men's 1000m Sprint (Scratch) 
 Pierre Trentin — Cycling, Men's 1000m Time Trial 
 Daniel Rebillard — Cycling, Men's 4000m Individual Pursuit
 Daniel Morelon and Pierre Trentin — Cycling, Men's 2000m Tandem 
 Jean-Jacques Guyon — Equestrian, Three-Day Event Individual 
 Gilles Berolatti, Jacques Dimont, Jean-Claude Magnan, Christian Noël, and Daniel Revenu — Fencing, Men's Foil Team

Silver
 Pierre Jonquères d'Oriola, Janou Lefebvre and Marcel Rozier — Equestrian, Jumping Team 
 Daniel Robin — Wrestling, Men's Greco-Roman Welterweight 
 Daniel Robin — Wrestling, Men's Freestyle Welterweight

Bronze
 Roger Bambuck, Jocelyn Delecour, Gérard Fenouil, and Claude Piquemal — Athletics, Men's 4 × 100 m Relay
 Pierre Trentin — Cycling, Men's 1000m Sprint (Scratch) 
 Daniel Revenu — Fencing, Men's Foil Individual
 Raoul Gueguen, Jean-Pierre Guidicelli, and Lucien Guiguet — Modern Pentathlon, Men's Team Competition
 Alain Mosconi — Swimming, Men's 400m Freestyle

Athletics

Boxing

Canoeing

Cycling

Fourteen cyclists represented France in 1968.

Individual road race
 Stéphan Abrahamian
 Alain Vasseur
 Daniel Ducreux
 Jean-Pierre Paranteau

Team time trial
 Jean-Pierre Boulard
 Robert Bouloux
 Jean-Pierre Danguillaume
 Claude le Chatellier

Sprint
 Daniel Morelon
 Pierre Trentin

1000m time trial
 Pierre Trentin

Tandem
 Daniel Morelon
 Pierre Trentin

Individual pursuit
 Daniel Rébillard

Team pursuit
 Bernard Darmet
 Daniel Rébillard
 Jack Mourioux
 Alain van Lancker

Equestrian

Fencing

20 fencers, 15 men and 5 women, represented France in 1968.

Men's foil
 Daniel Revenu
 Christian Noël
 Jean-Claude Magnan

Men's team foil
 Jean-Claude Magnan, Daniel Revenu, Christian Noël, Gilles Berolatti, Jacques Dimont

Men's épée
 Jean-Pierre Allemand
 Jacques La Degaillerie
 Claude Bourquard

Men's team épée
 François Jeanne, Claude Bourquard, Yves Boissier, Jacques La Degaillerie, Jean-Pierre Allemand

Men's sabre
 Serge Panizza
 Marcel Parent
 Claude Arabo

Men's team sabre
 Marcel Parent, Claude Arabo, Bernard Vallée, Serge Panizza, Jean-Ernest Ramez

Women's foil
 Brigitte Gapais-Dumont
 Marie-Chantal Depetris-Demaille
 Cathérine Rousselet-Ceretti

Women's team foil
 Cathérine Rousselet-Ceretti, Brigitte Gapais-Dumont, Marie-Chantal Depetris-Demaille, Claudette Herbster-Josland, Annick Level

Football

Gymnastics

Hockey

Modern pentathlon

Three male pentathletes represented France in 1968. The team won the bronze medal.

Individual
 Raoul Gueguen
 Lucien Guiguet
 Jean-Pierre Giudicelli

Team
 Raoul Gueguen
 Lucien Guiguet
 Jean-Pierre Giudicelli

Rowing

Sailing

Shooting

Eight shooters, all men, represented France in 1968.

50 m pistol
 Louis Vignaud
 Paul Musso

50 m rifle, prone
 Jean-Luc Loret
 André Noël

Trap
 Pierre Candelo
 Michel Carrega

Skeet
 Alain Plante
 Jean-Paul Faber

Swimming

Weightlifting

Wrestling

References

Nations at the 1968 Summer Olympics
1968
Summer Olympics